Sai Kung North refers collectively to the areas on the southern side of Tolo Harbour and the northernmost part of the Sai Kung Peninsula. Part of this broad area is served by Sai Sha Road, a motorway between Sai Kung and Ma On Shan.

Geography 
Geographically it is a practical exclave of Tai Po District, along with Shek Ngau Chau, Tap Mun and Tung Ping Chau.

It includes the following areas:
 Hoi Ha
 Kei Ling Ha
 Nai Chung
 Pak Tam Au
 Port Island (Chek Chau)
 Sham Chung
 Tap Mun
 Wong Shek
 Wong Tei Tung

Transport 
The area historically relied on ferry transport from Tai Po Kau, until the pier there was relocated to Ma Liu Shui. The opening of Sai Sha Road and the development of Ma On Shan had made road transport available to the areas to the west of Three Fathoms Cove.

Politics and rural affairs 
Sai Kung North is covered by the Sai Kung North constituency in the Tai Po District Council. The Sai Kung North Rural Committee comprises the villages in the area, some of which known collectively as Shap Sze Heung.

See also 
 Hoi Ha Wan
 Three Fathoms Cove

References